Dynamite!! 2009 was a mixed martial arts and kickboxing events promoted by Fighting and Entertainment Group, held in the Saitama Super Arena in Saitama, Japan on December 31, 2009. The event included bouts that encompass the DREAM, Sengoku Raiden Championship, K-1, and K-1 World MAX banners. The event aired on HDNet in North America.

The event had the conclusion of the U18 K-1 KOSHIEN 62 kg Class Tournament. The Final Four, as decided from eight participants at K-1 World MAX 2009 World Championship Tournament Final in October, faced off in a one-night tournament to decide the K-1 KOSHIEN 2009 Champion.

Also, the conclusion of the DREAM Super Hulk tournament was held, continuing from the previous round which took place at Dream 11.

Background
On November 25, 2009, a press conference was held to announce co-promotion between DREAM and Sengoku for Dynamite!! 2009. Currently, there are plans for seven different "DREAM vs. Sengoku" fights on the card. The planned bout between Hidehiko Yoshida and Satoshi Ishii was officially moved from Sengoku's New Year's Eve show to Dynamite!! 2009. On December 22, 2009, it was announced that DREAM Lightweight champion Shinya Aoki would not be taking on fellow DREAM fighter Tatsuya Kawajiri in a challenge for the title belt, but instead would be fighting Lightweight Champion, Mizuto Hirota to fit the DREAM vs Sengoku card, but was not a unification bout.

Masato was originally intended to face Giorgio Petrosyan, the 2009 MAX Champion, but Petrosyan fractured a bone in his right hand during his semi-final bout versus Yuya Yamamoto. The fight was billed as Masato's retirement fight.

Hideo Tokoro was scheduled to face Marlon Sandro, but Sandro pulled out on short notice due to an injury. Jong Man Kim filled in for Sandro against Tokoro.

Results

Super Hulk Grand Prix 2009 Bracket

 Note: Bob Sapp was brought back into the tournament replacing Gegard Mousasi due to injury.

K-1 KOSHIEN 62kg 2009 Bracket

DREAM vs. Sengoku results
This event marked the first inter-promotional fights between Japanese MMA organizations DREAM and Sengoku Raiden Championship.  Leading into the main event, each organization had won 4 respective bouts.  Shinya Aoki's submission victory resulted in the tie-breaking win, giving DREAM the final winning result of 5 wins and 4 losses.

See also
 Dream (mixed martial arts)
 List of Dream champions
 2009 in DREAM

References

Dream (mixed martial arts) events
K-1 events
World Victory Road events
2009 in Japan
2009 in kickboxing
2009 in mixed martial arts
Kickboxing in Japan
Sport in Saitama (city)